Kilsheelan–Kilcash GAA is a Gaelic Athletic Association club located in the village of Kilsheelan in South County Tipperary, Ireland.

Achievements
 Tipperary Senior Football Championship Winners 1930, 1933, 1968, 1972 | Runners-Up 1989, 1902, 1905, 1906, 1981
 South Tipperary Senior Football Championship Winners 1930, 1933, 1970, 1983, 2014, 2015 | Runners-Up 1979, 2013
 Tipperary Intermediate Football Championship Winners 2010
 South Tipperary Intermediate Football Championship Winners (5) 1993, 1994, 2003, 2006, 2010
 South Tipperary Intermediate Hurling Championship Winners (6) 1967, 1970, 1981, 1984, 1997, 2015
 South Tipperary Junior Football Championship Winners (5) 1924, 1925, 1942, 1950, 1964
 South Tipperary Junior B Football Championship Winners (3) 1992, 1996, 2000
 Tipperary Junior A Hurling Championship Winners (1) 2012
 South Tipperary Junior A Hurling Championship Winners (5) 1957, 1964, 1980, 2011, 2012
 Tipperary Under-21 B Football Championship Winners (1) 2003, 2019
 South Tipperary Under-21 B Football Championship Winners (1) 2003
 South Tipperary Under-21 A Hurling Championship Winners (1) 2014
 South Tipperary Minor Football Championship Winners (1) 1946
 Tipperary Minor B Football Championship Winners (2) 2010, 2014
 South Tipperary Minor B Football Championship Winners (3) 2010, 2014, 2016
 South Tipperary Minor C Football Championship Winners (1) 1996
 South Tipperary Minor B Hurling Championship Winners (1) 1998

Notable players
 Evan Comerford
 Mark Kehoe
 Tom Larkin
 Bill Maher
 Paul Maher
 David Power, managed Tipperary to the 2020 Munster Senior Football Championship title
 Séamus Roche (referee)

References

External links
Official Site
GAA Info Website

Gaelic games clubs in County Tipperary